Praepostor (sometimes spelt Praepositor) is a term now used chiefly at English independent schools, such as Aldenham, Brentwood, Clifton, Eton, Giggleswick, Harrow, Rugby, Shrewsbury, Tonbridge and Uppingham as well as at other schools such as the former Derby School which began as grammar schools for the teaching of Latin grammar. It is the equivalent of prefect. The word originally referred to a monastic prior and is late Latin of the Middle Ages, derived from classical Latin praepositus, "placed before".

The use of praepostor in the context of a school is derived from the practice of using older children to lead or control younger children. This originally involved both leading in lessons and keeping general discipline, but latterly it involved only discipline. 

Children helping to lead classes were also called monitors, and the terms praepostor and monitor are roughly equivalent to prefect and sub-prefect in many other English schools.

References
Chambers 20th Century Dictionary (W. & R. Chambers Ltd, 2004)

Education in England